Espoir: Sierra de Teruel (English title: Days of Hope or Man's Hope) is a 1938–39 Spanish-French black and white war film, directed by Boris Peskine and André Malraux. It was not commercially released until 1945. Malraux wrote the novel L'Espoir, or Man's Hope, published in 1937, which was basis for the film.  The director won the 1945 Prix Louis Delluc award.

The crash of a Spanish Republican Air Force Potez 540 plane near Valdelinares inspired André Malraux to write the novel.

Different years are given for the film's completion. The novel was published in French in 1937 and in English in 1938. The film uses war footage from 1938 and was edited, and other scenes shot, during 1938–1939.  It was finished in July 1939 and shown twice in Paris, but Francoist Spain applied pressure to censor it. All known copies were destroyed during World War II. A copy was found and the film was released again in 1945. In Spain, it was banned and was not screened until 1977, after the death of Franco.

Plot
Spanish Republican forces fight against the better-equipped Nationalist armies in the desolate Sistema Ibérico mountains of the Province of Teruel in 1937.

Cast
 Andrés Mejuto ... Captain Muñoz 
 Nicolás Rodríguez ... García
 José Santpere/ Josep Santpere ... Commander Peña
 Julio Peña ... Attignies
 Pedro Codina ... Captain Schneider
 José María Lado ... Peasant
 José María Ovies ... Partisan 
 José Telmo ... González
 Casimiro Hurtado ... Pilot
 Manolo González ... Mayor
 Juan de Dios Muñiz ... Pío
 José Ramón Giner ... Partisan who brings the arms
 Serafín Ferro ... Socialist pilot
José Calle ... Mayor

See also
List of Spanish Civil War films
List of war films
List of Spanish films

References

External links
 

1945 films
French black-and-white films
Spanish black-and-white films
1941 films
Spanish Civil War films
Louis Delluc Prize winners
Films scored by Darius Milhaud
1940s rediscovered films
French war drama films
1940s war drama films
Spanish war drama films
1941 drama films
1945 drama films
Rediscovered French films
Rediscovered Spanish films
1940s Spanish films
1940s French films